Khanandabil-e Sharqi Rural District is in the Central District of Khalkhal County, Ardabil province, Iran. At the census of 2006, its population was 15,102 in 3,576 households; there were 15,946 inhabitants in 4,400 households at the following census of 2011; and in the most recent census of 2016, the population of the rural district was 14,374 in 4,500 households. The largest of its 24 villages was Khujin, with 2,633 people.

References 

Khalkhal County

Rural Districts of Ardabil Province

Populated places in Ardabil Province

Populated places in Khalkhal County